Dean Benjamin McLaughlin (born October 25, 1901, Brooklyn, New York CIty; died December 8, 1965, Ann Arbor, Michigan, US) was an American astronomer. He was a professor of astronomy at the University of Michigan. He was the father of the science fiction author Dean B. McLaughlin, Jr. He received his B.S. (1923), his M.S. (1924) and his Ph.D. (1927) all from Michigan. McLaughlin married fellow astronomer Laura Elizabeth Hill in 1927. 

In 1954 he proposed the theory that there are volcanoes on Mars and that their eruptions change the albedo features called "mare" (The martian equivalent of Lunar mare). His proposal was partially confirmed in 1971 with the arrival of Mariner 9, which showed that strong winds could move dust around the planet, creating the changes of appearance formerly attributed to some kind of vegetation .

A crater on Mars was named in his honor, as is the crater McLaughlin on the far side of the Moon and the asteroid 2024 McLaughlin. In 2014 NASA scientists announced they had discovered evidence of water in Mars' McLaughlin Crater.

See also
 Richard Alfred Rossiter
 Rossiter–McLaughlin effect

References

External links
Dean B. McLaughlin, Faculty History Project, U. Michigan
The Ghosts of Astronomers Past by Rudi Paul Lindner

1901 births
1965 deaths
American astronomers
University of Michigan faculty
People from Brooklyn
Scientists from New York (state)
University of Michigan alumni